Abbas II Helmy Bey (also known as ʿAbbās Ḥilmī Pāshā) (14 July 1874 – 19 December 1944) was the last Khedive (Ottoman viceroy) of Egypt and Sudan, ruling from 8January 1892 to 19 December 1914. In 1914, after the Ottoman Empire joined the Central Powers in World War I, the nationalist Khedive was removed by the British, then ruling Egypt, in favour of his more pro-British uncle, Hussein Kamel, marking the de jure end of Egypt's four-century era as a province of the Ottoman Empire, which had begun in 1517.

Early life

Abbas II (full name: Abbas Hilmy), the great-great-grandson of Muhammad Ali, was born in Alexandria, Egypt on 14 July 1874. In 1887 he was ceremonially circumcised together with his younger brother Mohammed Ali Tewfik. The festivities lasted for three weeks and were carried out with great pomp. As a boy he visited the United Kingdom, and he had a number of British tutors in Cairo including a governess who taught him English. In a profile of Abbas II, the boys' annual, Chums, gave a lengthy account of his education. His father established a small school near the Abdin Palace in Cairo where European, Arab and Ottoman masters taught Abbas and his brother Mohammed Ali Tewfik. An American officer in the Egyptian army took charge of his military training.  He attended school at Lausanne, Switzerland; then, at the age of twelve, he was sent to the Haxius School in Geneva, in preparation for his entry into the Theresianum in Vienna. In addition to Arabic and Ottoman Turkish, he had good conversational knowledge of English, French and German.

Reign

Abbas II succeeded his father, Tewfik Pasha, as Khedive of Egypt and Sudan on 8 January 1892.  He was still in college in Vienna when he assumed the throne of the Khedivate of Egypt upon the sudden death of his father. He was barely of age according to Egyptian law; normally eighteen in cases of succession to the throne. For some time he did not willingly cooperate with the British, whose army had occupied Egypt in 1882. As he was young and eager to exercise his new power, he resented the interference of the British Agent and Consul General in Cairo, Sir Evelyn Baring, later made Lord Cromer. Lord Cromer initially supported Abbas but the new Khedive's nationalist agenda and association with anti-colonial Islamist movements put him in direct conflict with British colonial officers, and Cromer later interceded on behalf of Lord Kitchener (British commander in the Sudan) in an ongoing dispute with Abbas about Egyptian sovereignty and influence in that territory.

At the outset of his reign, Khedive Abbas II surrounded himself with a coterie of European advisers who opposed the British occupation of Egypt and Sudan and encouraged the young khedive to challenge Cromer by replacing his ailing prime minister with an Egyptian nationalist. At Cromer's behest, Lord Rosebery, the British foreign secretary, sent Abbas II a letter stating that the Khedive was obliged to consult the British consul on such issues as cabinet appointments. In January 1894 Abbas II made an inspection tour of Sudanese and Egyptian frontier troops stationed near the southern border, the Mahdists being at the time still in control of the Sudan. At Wadi Halfa the Khedive made public remarks disparaging the Egyptian army units commanded by British officers. The British commander of the Egyptian army, Sir Herbert Kitchener, immediately threatened to resign. Kitchener further insisted on the dismissal of a nationalist under-secretary of war appointed by Abbas II and that an apology be made for the Khedive's criticism of the army and its officers.

By 1899 he had come to accept British counsels. Also in 1899, British diplomat Alfred Mitchell-Innes was appointed Under-Secretary of State for Finance in Egypt, and in 1900 Abbas II paid a second visit to Britain, during which he said he thought the British had done good work in Egypt, and declared himself ready to cooperate with the British officials administering Egypt and Sudan. He gave his formal approval for the establishment of a sound system of justice for Egyptian nationals, a significant reduction in taxation, increased affordable and sound education, the inauguration of the substantial irrigation works such as the Aswan Low Dam and the Assiut Barrage, and the reconquest of Sudan. He displayed more interest in agriculture than in statecraft. His farm of cattle and horses at Qubbah, near Cairo, was a model for agricultural science in Egypt, and he created a similar establishment at Muntazah, just east of Alexandria. He married the Princess Ikbal Hanem and had several children. Muhammad Abdul Moneim, the heir-apparent, was born on 20 February 1899. 

Although Abbas II no longer publicly opposed the British, he secretly created, supported and sustained the Egyptian nationalist movement, which came to be led by Mustafa Kamil. He also funded the anti-British newspaper Al-Mu'ayyad. As Kamil's thrust was increasingly aimed at winning popular support for a nationalist political party, Khedive Abbas publicly distanced himself from the Nationalists. Their demand for a constitutional government in 1906 was rebuffed by Abbas II, and the following year he formed the National Party, led by Mustafa Kamil Pasha, to counter the Ummah Party of the Egyptian moderates. However, in general, he had no real political power. When the Egyptian Army was sent to fight Abd al-Rahman al-Mahdi in Sudan in 1896, he only found out about it because the Austro-Hungarian Archduke Francis Ferdinand was in Egypt and told him after being informed of it by a British Army officer.

His relations with Cromer's successor, Sir Eldon Gorst, however, were excellent, and they co-operated in appointing the cabinets headed by Butrus Ghali in 1908 and Muhammad Sa'id in 1910 and in checking the power of the National Party. The appointment of Kitchener to succeed Gorst in 1912 displeased Abbas II, and relations between the Khedive and the British deteriorated. Kitchener, who exiled or imprisoned the leaders of the National Party, often complained about "that wicked little Khedive" and wanted to depose him.

On 25 July 1914, at the onset of World War I, Abbas II was in Constantinople and was wounded in his hands and cheeks during a failed assassination attempt. On 5 November 1914 when Great Britain declared war on Turkey, he was accused of deserting Egypt by not promptly returning home. The British also believed that he was plotting against their rule, as he had attempted to appeal to Egyptians and Sudanese to support the Central Powers against the British.  So when the Ottoman Empire joined the Central Powers in World War I, the United Kingdom declared Egypt a Sultanate under British protection on 18 December 1914 and deposed Abbas II.

During the war, Abbas II sought support from the Ottomans, including proposing to lead an attack on the Suez Canal. He was replaced by the British by his uncle Hussein Kamel from 1914 to 1917, with the title of Sultan of Egypt. Hussein Kamel issued a series of restrictive orders to strip Abbas II of property in Egypt and Sudan and forbade contributions to him. These also barred Abbas from entering Egyptian territory and stripped him of the right to sue in Egyptian courts. This did not prevent his progeny, however, from exercising their rights. Abbas II finally accepted the new order on 12 May 1931 and formally abdicated. He retired to Switzerland, where he wrote The Anglo-Egyptian Settlement (1930). He died at Geneva on 19 December 1944, aged 70, 30 years to the day after the end of his reign as Khedive.

Marriages and issue

His first marriage in Cairo on 19 February 1895 was to Ikbal Hanem (Istanbul, Ottoman Empire, 22 October 1876Istanbul, 10 February 1941), and they had six children, two sons and four daughters: 
 Princess Emine Helmy (Montaza Palace, Alexandria, 12 February 18951954), unmarried and without issue
 Princess Atiyetullah (Cairo, 9 June 18961971), married first Jalaluddin Pasha (Caucasus 1885Istanbul 1930), fourth son of Mehmed Ferid Pasha, married second Ahmad Shavkat Bey Bayur, second son of Kâmil Pasha. She had issue two sons by her first Husband.
 Princess Fethiye (27 November 189730 November 1923), married Hami Bey, without issue.
 Prince Muhammad Abdel Moneim, Heir Apparent and Regent of Egypt and Sudan (Montaza Palace, Alexandria, 20 February 1899Istanbul, 1 December 1979), married Fatma Neslişah (Nişantaşı Palace, Istanbul 4 February 1921Heliopolis Palace, Cairo 2 April 2012) in Cairo 26 September 1940, and had two children:
Prince Sultanzade Abbas Helmy (born 1941), married and had one daughter and one son   
Princess İkbal Helmy Abdulmunim Hanımsultan (born 1944), unmarried and without issue 
 Princess Lutfiya Shavkat (Lütfiye Şevket) (Cairo, 29 September 19001975 Cairo), married Omar Muhtar Katırcıoğlu (Çamlıca, Turkey 1902Istanbul 15 July 1935), third son of Mahmud Muhtar Pasha and Princess Nimetullah Khanum Effendi, a daughter of Isma'il Pasha, on 5 May 1923 and had two daughters:
 Emine Neşedil Katırcıoğlu (born 1927), widow who had three daughters
 Zehra Kadriye Katırcıoğlu (Istanbul 12 March 1929Istanbul 15 May 2012), married Ahmet Cevat Tugay and had four sons and a daughter
 Prince Muhammed Abdel Kader (4 February 1902Montreux, 21 April 1919)

His second marriage in Çubuklu, Turkey on 1 March 1910 was to Hungarian noblewoman Marianna Török de Szendrö, who took the name Zübeyde Cavidan Hanım (Philadelphia, Pennsylvania, U.S., 8 January 1874after 1951). They divorced in 1913 without issue.

Honours

Notes

Footnotes

References

Further reading

External links

 Al-Ahram on Abbas in exile
 
 

|-

|-

|-

1874 births
1944 deaths
Dethroned monarchs
Monarchs who abdicated
19th-century Egyptian monarchs
20th-century Egyptian monarchs
Khedives of Egypt
Muhammad Ali dynasty
Egyptian expatriates in Austria
Egyptian expatriates in Switzerland
Albanians from the Ottoman Empire
Egyptian people of Albanian descent
Ottoman governors of Egypt
Commanders Grand Cross of the Order of the Polar Star
Grand Crosses of the Order of Franz Joseph
Grand Croix of the Légion d'honneur
Recipients of the Order of Saint Stanislaus (Russian)
Knights Grand Cross of the Order of Saints Maurice and Lazarus
Grand Crosses of the Order of Saint Stephen of Hungary
Honorary Knights Grand Cross of the Order of the Bath
Honorary Knights Grand Cross of the Order of St Michael and St George
Honorary Knights Grand Cross of the Royal Victorian Order
Grand Crosses of the Order of the Dannebrog
Knights Grand Cross of the Order of Chula Chom Klao
Recipients of the Order of the Medjidie, 1st class
Knights of the Order of Pope Pius IX
Slave owners
Recipients of orders, decorations, and medals of Ethiopia